Michaela Hončová (born 22 December 1992) is an inactive Slovak tennis player.

Hončová has won five singles titles and nine doubles titles on the ITF Women's Circuit. On 23 September 2013, she reached her best singles ranking of world No. 235. On 6 March 2017, she peaked at No. 178 in the WTA doubles rankings.

ITF Circuit finals

Singles: 12 (5 titles, 7 runner–ups)

Doubles: 24 (9 titles, 15 runner–ups)

References

External links
 
 

1992 births
Living people
Tennis players from Bratislava
Slovak female tennis players
21st-century Slovak women